525 Market Street, once known as First Market Tower,  is an office skyscraper at the southwest corner of First- and Market Streets in the financial district of San Francisco, California. The , 39 floor tower was the second largest office building by square footage in the city (after 555 California Street) when completed in 1973. It is owned by the New York State Teachers Retirement System since 1998. It is one of 39 San Francisco high rises reported by the U.S. Geological Survey as potentially vulnerable to a large earthquake, due to a flawed welding technique.

History
In 2020, 49% stake of the building is sold to a Deutsche Bank Subsidiary for $682 million.

Tenants
 Amazon rents 40% of the total area. It hosts the Amazon Web Services and Amazon Music divisions. 
 Sephora hosts their North America headquarters.

References

External links

Skyscraper office buildings in San Francisco
Market Street (San Francisco)
Office buildings completed in 1973
Financial District, San Francisco
1973 establishments in California